Lester Marshall (4 February 1902 – 22 October 1956) was an English professional footballer who played as a full back, half-back or a centre forward in the Football League for Lincoln City and in non-League football for Rowntrees, Selby Town, York City and Scarborough.

References

1902 births
Sportspeople from Castleford
1956 deaths
English footballers
Association football defenders
Association football midfielders
Association football forwards
Nestlé Rowntree F.C. players
Selby Town F.C. players
York City F.C. players
Lincoln City F.C. players
Scarborough F.C. players
Midland Football League players
English Football League players